The denier (. d.) or penny was a medieval coin which takes its name from the Frankish coin first issued in the late seventh century; in English it is sometimes referred to as a silver penny. Its appearance represents the end of gold coinage, which, at the start of Frankish rule, had either been Roman (Byzantine) or "pseudo-imperial" (minted by the Franks in imitation of Byzantine coinage). Silver would be the basis for Frankish coinage from then on. The denier was minted in France, Cyprus and parts of the Italian peninsula for the whole of the Middle Ages, in states such as the patriarchate of Aquileia, the Kingdom of Sicily, the Republic of Genoa, the Republic of Siena, Kingdom of Cyprus, and the crusader state Kingdom of Jerusalem, among others.

History

Coin
Around AD 755, amid the Carolingian Reforms, Pepin the Short introduced a new currency system which was eventually adjusted so that 12 pence equaled one shilling (or ) and 20 shillings equaled one pound (or). Later, three deniers equaled one liard. Only the denier was an actual coin; the rest were money of account. This system and the denier itself served as the model for many of Europe's currencies, including sterling, the Italian lira, the Spanish dinero and the Portuguese dinheiro.

Interest rates
In Ancien Régime France, the denier was used as a notional measure of interest rates on loans. Thus, a rate of 4% (1/25) would be expressed as "denier 25"; a rate of 5% (1/20) as "denier 20"; and so forth.

See also

denarius
dinar
dinero
penny
pfennig

References

Coins of France
Medieval currencies
Economic history of France